Football clubs from Ekstraklasa – the top Polish professional league for men's association football teams – have participated in European football competitions since 1955–56 season, when Gwardia Warsaw took part in the inaugural European Cup.

The biggest success by Polish clubs in UEFA-administered competitions is reaching a semifinal in European Cup. The first one to achieve this round was Legia Warsaw in 1969–70 season followed by Widzew Łódź in 1982–83 season. Moreover, Górnik Zabrze reached the final of 1969–70 European Cup Winners' Cup as did Ruch Chorzów in 1998 UEFA Intertoto Cup.

Polish clubs were more successful in non-UEFA-administered Intertoto Cup. Polonia Bytom won the 1964–65 edition followed by losing in the final next year. Odra Opole and Zagłębie Sosnowiec reached semi-finals, each once. From 1967 to 1994, when only a group stage was held, 14 different clubs won their groups 24 times.

Polish club distinctions in European competitions

European Cup / UEFA Champions League (1955/56 – present)

Inter-Cities Fairs Cup / UEFA Cup / Europa League (1955/56 – present)

UEFA Europa Conference League (2021/22 – present)

UEFA Cup Winners' Cup (1960/61 – 1998/99)

UEFA Intertoto Cup (1961/62 – 2008)

Appearances in the main UEFA competitions

As of 14 July 2022

App. = Appearances; Q = Qualifying Round; R = Round; QF = Quarter-finals; SF = Semi-finals; F = Final; EC = European Cup; UCL = UEFA Champions League; UC = UEFA Cup; UEL = UEFA Europa League; UECL = UEFA Europa Conference League; CWC = UEFA Cup Winners' Cup; ;

European Cup/Champions League

Bold denotes the competition winner.

Inter-Cities Fairs Cup/UEFA Cup/Europa League

Non-UEFA

UEFA 

Bold denotes the competition winner.

UEFA Europa Conference League

Cup Winners' Cup (defunct)

Bold denotes the competition winner.

UEFA Intertoto Cup (defunct)

Non-UEFA

UEFA

Bold denotes the competition winner.
Bold and italic denote the group winner (only 1967–1994 seasons).

Intra-national matches

References

External links
 UEFA Website
 Polish Football Association Website

European football clubs in international competitions